Mn2+-dependent ADP-ribose/CDP-alcohol diphosphatase (Mn2+-dependent ADP-ribose/CDP-alcohol pyrophosphatase, ADPRibase-Mn) is an enzyme with systematic name CDP-choline phosphohydrolase. This enzyme catalyses the following chemical reaction

 (1) CDP-choline + H2O  CMP + phosphocholine
 (2) ADP-ribose + H2O  AMP + D-ribose 5-phosphate

This enzyme requires Mn2+, which cannot be replaced by Mg2+.

References

External links 
 

EC 3.6.1